Events from the year 1959 in the United Kingdom.

Incumbents
 Monarch – Elizabeth II
 Prime Minister – Harold Macmillan (Conservative)
Parliament
 41st (until 18 September)
 42nd (starting 20 October)

Events
15 January – Tyne Tees Television, the ITV franchise for North East England, goes on air.
22 January – Racing driver Mike Hawthorn is killed after his Jaguar 3.4-litre car collides with a tree on the A3 near Guildford.
29 January – Dense fog brings chaos to Britain.
19 February – First of the London and Zürich Agreements under which the U.K. agrees to grant independence to Cyprus.
23 February – UK Prime Minister Harold Macmillan holds talks with the Soviet leader Nikita Khrushchev on a visit to the USSR.
7 March – Independence movement leader Kanyama Chiume, wanted in the British territory of Nyasaland, flees to London and goes into hiding.
10 March – Comedy film Carlton-Browne of the F.O. released.
30 March – 20,000 demonstrators attend a CND rally in Trafalgar Square.

1 April – The official name of the administrative county of Hampshire is changed from "County of Southampton" to "County of Hampshire".
2 April – United Dairies merges with Cow & Gate to form Unigate Dairies.
22 April – Ballerina Margot Fonteyn is released from prison in Panama having been suspected of involvement in a planned coup against the government of President Ernesto de la Guardia.
30 April – Icelandic gunboat fires on British trawlers in the first of the "Cod Wars" over fishing rights.
 
2 May
 The Chapelcross nuclear power station in Scotland opens.
 Nottingham Forest beat Luton Town 2–1 in the FA Cup final at Wembley Stadium.
7 May – Scientist and novelist C. P. Snow delivers an influential Rede Lecture on The Two Cultures, concerning a perceived breakdown of communication between the sciences and humanities, in the Senate House, University of Cambridge. It is subsequently published as The Two Cultures and the Scientific Revolution.
24 May – British Empire Day becomes Commonwealth Day.
28 May – Mermaid Theatre opens in the City of London.
May – The first Ten Tors event is held on Dartmoor.
 June – Import tariffs lifted in the United Kingdom.
1 June – First showing on BBC Television of Juke Box Jury chaired by David Jacobs.
3 June – Singapore is granted self-governing status.
11 June – Christopher Cockerell's invention the hovercraft officially launched. On 25 July the SR.N1 craft crosses the English Channel from Calais to Dover in just over 2 hours.
22 June – Harrods enters talks with Debenhams over a possible £34,000,000 merger.
23 June – Klaus Fuchs is released from Wakefield prison having served over nine years for giving British nuclear secrets to the Soviet Union and moves to East Germany.
July – Cliff Richard and The Drifters release a recording of the song "Living Doll" written by Lionel Bart.
 9 July – Wing Commander Michael Beetham flying a Royal Air Force Vickers Valiant sets a record of 11 hours 27 minutes for a non-stop London–Cape Town flight.
28 July – UK postcodes are introduced for the first time, as an experiment, in the city of Norwich.
29 July
 Mental Health Act becomes law, modernising the care of mental disorder.
 Obscene Publications Act becomes law.
 Legitimacy Act becomes law, permitting the legitimisation of a child, one of whose parents was married to a third person at the time of their birth, by subsequent marriage of the parents.
4 August – Barclays become the first bank to install a computer.
24 August – House of Fraser wins the bidding war for Harrods in a £37,000,000 deal.
26 August – BMC launches the Mini, a two-door, 10-foot-long mini-car with an 848cc four-cylinder transverse engine and a top speed of 70 mph, designed to carry the driver and three passengers and their luggage in comfort. The designer is Alec Issigonis, who also designed the Morris Minor.
31 August – Harold Macmillan and US President Dwight Eisenhower make a joint television broadcast from Downing Street.
18 September – Auchengeich mining disaster: 47 miners die as the result of an underground fire at Auchengeich Colliery, Lanarkshire, Scotland.
7 October – Southend Pier is damaged in a fire.
8 October – The 1959 general election is held resulting in a record third successive Conservative victory. Harold Macmillan, running under the slogan "Life's better with the Conservatives, Don't let Labour ruin it", increases the Conservatives majority in Parliament to 100 seats. The Labour Party contest their first general election under the leadership of Hugh Gaitskell. Among the new Members of Parliament entering the Commons for the first time is future Education Secretary and Prime Minister Margaret Thatcher, representing Finchley in North London.
12 October – Large-scale diamond robbery in London.
21 October – Mau Mau leader Dedan Kimathi is arrested in Nyeri, Kenya.
30 October – Ronnie Scott's Jazz Club opens in the Soho district of London.
2 November – The first section of the M1 motorway is opened between Watford and Rugby. It is set to be extended over the next few years, southwards to Edgware and northwards to Leeds.
5 November – Philip John Noel-Baker wins the Nobel Peace Prize.
11 November – London Transport introduces the production AEC Routemaster double-decker bus into public service.
14 November – The nuclear Dounreay Fast Reactor in Scotland achieves criticality.
17 November – Prestwick and Renfrew Airports become the first airports in the UK with duty-free shops.
20 November – Britain becomes a founder member of the European Free Trade Association.
December – Health enthusiast Dr. Barbara Moore walks from Edinburgh to London.
6 December – Aberdeen trawler George Robb runs aground at Duncansby Head in Scotland in a severe gale with the loss of all 12 crew.
8 December – Broughty Ferry life-boat Mona capsizes on service to North Carr Lightship in Scotland: all eight life-boat crew are lost.
28 December – Associated-Rediffusion first airs the children's television series Ivor the Engine, made by Oliver Postgate and Peter Firmin's Smallfilms in stop motion animation using cardboard cut-outs.

Undated
 London County Council completes first portion of Alton Estate in Roehampton, southwest London, considered a model of post-war public housing.
 "Aluminium War": concluding the first hostile takeover of a public company in the UK, Tube Investments (under its chairman Ivan Stedeford), allied with Reynolds Metals of the United States and advised by Siegmund Warburg of S. G. Warburg & Co., secure control of British Aluminium.
 The iconic Bush TR82 transistor radio, by Ogle Design, is launched.
 North of Scotland Hydro-Electric Board's Sloy-Awe Hydro-Electric Power Scheme becomes fully operational.
 Car ownership in Britain now exceeds 30% of households.
 Economic growth for the year is a very strong 7.2% while the Retail Price Index shows a zero percentage change over the year.
 Noise Abatement Society established.
 Approximate date – Ballads and Blues folk club founded by Ewan MacColl and others in a London pub in Soho as part of the second British folk revival.

Publications
 Agatha Christie's novel Cat Among the Pigeons.
 Ian Fleming's novel Goldfinger.
 Colin MacInnes' novel Absolute Beginners.
 Spike Milligan's collection Silly Verse for Kids.
 Iona and Peter Opie's study The Lore and Language of Schoolchildren.
 Mervyn Peake's novel Titus Alone, last completed of the Gormenghast series.
 Alan Sillitoe's story The Loneliness of the Long Distance Runner.
 Keith Waterhouse's novel Billy Liar.

Births

January – February
4 January – John Batchelor, racing driver, businessman and political activist (died 2010)
5 January – David Eastwood, English historian and academic
7 January – Angela Smith, British Labour Co-operative politician and MP for Basildon
12 January – Simon Tolkien, novelist
16 January – Sade Adu, Nigerian-born British singer, composer, songwriter and record producer
29 January – Frank Key, writer (died 2019)
30 January – Alex Hyde-White, English actor
3 February – Lol Tolhurst, cofounder and drummer/keyboardist of rock band The Cure
4 February – John Wraw, Anglican prelate (died 2017)
6 February – Martyn Quayle, politician (died 2016)
7 February – Mick McCarthy, football player and manager
11 February – Deborah Meaden, businesswoman
15 February 
 Adam Boulton, English journalist
 Ali Campbell, English singer-songwriter and guitarist 
 Martin Rowson, English author and illustrator
18 February 
 Jayne Atkinson, English-born actress
 David Parker, swimmer (died 2010)
23 February – Richard Dodds, British field hockey player
27 February – Simon Critchley, British philosopher

March – April
1 March – Nick Griffin, British politician, chairman of the British National Party (BNP)
9 March – Mark Carwardine, British zoologist
15 March – Ben Okri, Nigerian-born poet and novelist
19 March – Terry Hall, British singer (died 2022)
20 March
Steve McFadden, British actor
Peter Truscott, Baron Truscott, Labour politician and peer
21 March – Colin Jones, Welsh boxer
29 March – Richard Cousins, English businessman (died 2017)
30 March – Andrew Bailey, English banker
4 April – Gordon Dunne, Northern Irish politician (died 2021)
5 April – Ian Pearson, British Labour politician and MP for Dudley South
7 April – Nigel Walker, footballer (died 2014)
11 April – John Myers, radio executive (died 2019)
14 April – Ali Brownlee, radio sports broadcaster (died 2016)
15 April – Emma Thompson, English actress, comedian and screenwriter
16 April 
 Yvonne Carter, general practitioner and academic (died 2009) 
 Alison Ramsay, Scottish field hockey player
17 April 
 Imogen Bain, actress (died 2014)
 Sean Bean, actor 
 Peter Doig, British painter
21 April – Robert Smith, British musician (The Cure)
24 April – Paula Yates, television presenter (died 2000)
25 April – Adrian Sanders, British Liberal Democrat politician and MP for Torbay
27 April – Sheena Easton, Scottish singer

May – June
3 May – Ben Elton, English comedian and writer
4 May – Dick Bradsell, bartender (died 2016)
5 May – Ian McCulloch, English rock singer-songwriter (Echo & the Bunnymen)
12 May 
Mark Davies, Roman Catholic bishop of Shrewsbury
Deborah Warner, stage director and producer
13 May – Peter Longbottom, cyclist (died 1998)
15 May – Andrew Eldritch, né Taylor, English gothic rock singer-songwriter (The Sisters of Mercy)
16 May – Tracy Hyde, English actress and model
17 May
Richard Barrons, English general
Paul Whitehouse, Welsh comedian and actor
18 May 
 Graham Dilley, crickieter (died 2011)
 Rupert Soames, businessman 
20 May – Gregory Gray, Northern Irish singer-songwriter (died 2019)
22 May
 Graham Fellows, English comedy performer
 Morrissey, English alternative rock singer-songwriter
23 May – Bob Mortimer, English comedian and actor
27 May – Gerard Kelly, Scottish actor (died 2010)
28 May – John Morgan, writer and etiquette expert (died 2000) 
29 May
 Rupert Everett, English actor
 Adrian Paul, English-born actor
 Tessa Tennant, English green investment campaigner (died 2018)
30 May – David Thomas, cricketer (died 2012)
1 June
 Martin Brundle, English Formula One motor racing driver
 John Pullinger, English statistician and librarian
 Peter Skinner, English Labour politician and MEP for South East England
6 June – Lindsay Posner, English theatre director and manager
11 June – Hugh Laurie, English actor, comedian and writer
19 June 
 Ray Deakin, footballer (died 2008)
 Sophie Grigson, English cookery writer and celebrity chef
21 June – John Baron, English Conservative politician and MP for Billericay
26 June – Lucy Kellaway, English columnist at the Financial Times and teacher
27 June – Clint Boon, English rock keyboardist (Inspiral Carpets) and DJ
28 June – Sally Morgan, Baroness Morgan of Huyton, English Labour politician and educationalist
29 June – Richard Vranch, English comedian, actor and television panel show participant
30 June – Jane Gregory, Olympic equestrian (died 2011)

July – August
3 July 
Julie Burchill, journalist
Graham Roberts, footballer and manager
4 July – Jan Brittin, cricketer (died 2017)
8 July – Pauline Quirke, actress 
11 July – Steve Whatley, actor and television presenter (died 2005)
13 July – Richard Leman, field hockey player
15 July – Charles Farr, civil servant (died 2019)
18 July – Jonathan Dove, operatic composer
31 July – Kim Newman, journalist, film critic and fiction writer
1 August 
 Joe Elliott, rock singer (Def Leppard)
 Desmond Noonan, gangster (died 2005)
5 August – Pete Burns, pop singer (died 2016)
20 August – Andrew Pelling, Conservative politician and MP for Croydon Central
24 August – Meg Munn, Labour Co-operative politician and MP for Sheffield Heeley
27 August – Jeanette Winterson, novelist
28 August – John Yems, football manager

September – October
5 September – Michael Lord-Castle, business person
11 September – Colin Butts, novelist and screenwriter (died 2018) 
12 September – Mike Barrett, footballer (died 1984)
13 September – Andy Gray, Scottish actor (died 2021)
18 September 
 Ian Arkwright, English footballer
 Lucy Birley, model, photographer and socialite (died 2018)
20 September – Kevin Stonehouse, footballer (died 2019)
21 September – Corinne Drewery, singer-songwriter and fashion designer
23 September – Karen Pierce, British diplomat
24 September – Drummie Zeb, reggae musician (died 2022)
28 September – Paul 'Trouble' Anderson, DJ (died 2018)
7 October – Simon Cowell, English music producer and television talent show judge
10 October
Mark Johnston, Scottish-born racehorse trainer
Kirsty MacColl, British singer and songwriter (died 2000)
15 October 
 Sarah, Duchess of York
 Tibor Fischer, British novelist and short story writer
 Andy Holmes, rower (died 2010)
16 October
 Gary Kemp, English pop artist (Spandau Ballet)
 John Whittingdale, British Conservative politician and MP for Maldon and Chelmsford East
20 October – Niamh Cusack, Irish-born actress
21 October – Cleveland Watkiss, jazz vocalist
24 October – Ruth Perednik, English-Israeli psychologist and academic
27 October – Liz Howe, ecologist (died 2019)

November – December
1 November – Susanna Clarke, British writer
2 November
Kevin Ashman, English quiz player
Peter Mullan, Scottish actor
9 November
Andy Kershaw, British music broadcaster
Frances O'Grady, British trades union leader
14 November – Paul McGann, British actor
18 November – Jimmy Quinn, Irish footballer and football manager
25 November 
 Mark Andrews, rower (died 2020)
 Charles Kennedy, Scottish Liberal Democrat politician (died 2015)
26 November – Dai Davies Welsh politician and independent MP
30 November – Lorraine Kelly, Scottish presenter and journalist
2 December – Gwyneth Strong, British actress
5 December – Robbie France, drummer (died 2012)
6 December – Stephen Hepburn, British Labour MP for Jarrow
10 December – Kevin Ash, journalist and author (d. 2013)
11 December – Phil Woolas, disgraced Labour MP
12 December – Jasper Conran, English designer
28 December – Andy McNab, British soldier turned novelist
29 November – Richard Borcherds, mathematician
30 December – Tracey Ullman, English comedian, actress, singer, dancer, screenwriter and author

Unknown dates
 Dilly Braimoh, African-British television presenter and producer
 Amanda Craig, British novelist
 Edith Hall, classicist
 Mick Hume, British journalist and organiser of the Revolutionary Communist Party
 Mick Manning, British children's author and illustrator
 Jasper Morrison, English product and furniture designer
 Keith Chapman, British television writer and producer

Deaths

14 January – G. D. H. Cole, political and economic theorist, historian and detective fiction writer (born 1889)
22 January – Mike Hawthorn, English race car driver (car crash) (born 1929)
15 February – Sir Owens Willans Richardson, British physicist, Nobel Prize laureate (born 1879)
21 February – Kathleen Freeman, classical scholar (born 1897)
26 February – Princess Alexandra, 2nd Duchess of Fife (Princess Arthur of Connaught), member of the royal family (born 1891)
25 April – Janet Philip, academic administrator (born 1876)
11 June – Gordon Selwyn, educator and Anglican priest (born 1885)
11 July – Charlie Parker, English cricketer (born 1882)
5 August – Edgar A. Guest, English poet (born 1881)
19 August
Jacob Epstein, American-born British sculptor (born 1880)
Claude Grahame-White, English aviator (born 1879)
6 September – Kay Kendall, English actress (born 1926) (leukaemia)
21 September – Agnes Nicholls, operatic soprano (born 1877)
25 September
 Gerard Hoffnung, German-born humorist (born 1925)
 Vera Laughton Mathews, naval officer (born 1888)
15 November – Charles Thomson Rees Wilson, Scottish physicist, Nobel Prize laureate (born 1869)
26 November – Albert Ketèlbey, pianist, conductor and composer (born 1875)
14 December – Stanley Spencer, painter (born 1891)

See also
 1959 in British music
 1959 in British television
 List of British films of 1959

References

 
Years of the 20th century in the United Kingdom